A by-election was held for the New South Wales Legislative Assembly electorate of Hornsby on 23 February 2002 because Stephen O'Doherty resigned.

Dates

Results

Stephen O'Doherty resigned.

See also
Electoral results for the district of Hornsby
List of New South Wales state by-elections

Notes

References

2002 elections in Australia
New South Wales state by-elections
2000s in New South Wales